Christopher Long may refer to:

Christopher P. Long, American academic and Dean of the College of Arts and Letters at Michigan State University
Christopher Long, an amateur geologist who discovered the White Scar Caves in 1923
Christopher William Long (born in 1938), retired British diplomat
Christopher Long (director), American film director, actor, producer and screenwriter
Christopher Long (bicyclist), Critical Mass bicyclist involved in a controversial 2008 dispute with the NYPD
Chris Long (priest) (born 1947), Archdeacon of Ferns and Archdeacon of Cashel, Waterford and Lismore
Chris Long (footballer) English footballer for Crewe Alexandra

See also
Chris Long (disambiguation)